Rodolfo Oroz (8 July 1895 – 13 April 1997) was a Chilean writer, professor, and philologist. He won the Chilean National Prize for Literature in 1978.

References

1895 births
1997 deaths
Chilean centenarians
Chilean male writers
National Prize for Literature (Chile) winners
Men centenarians